Hybrid mail is mail that is delivered using a combination of electronic and physical delivery. Usually, it involves digital data being transformed into physical letter items at distributed print centres located as close as possible to the final delivery addresses. An e-mail letter (also L-mail and letter mail) is a letter which sent as an email using a computer then printed out and delivered as a traditional (physical) letter. It is a communication means between the cyber and the material world. The printer or mail transfer agent prints the electronic mail on paper, the mail transport agent packs it into an envelope and the mail delivery agent or postman delivers it to the receiver's mailbox. Generally there is a fee for this service; however very small amounts and single email letters may be free of charge depending on the service provider and generally fees are much lower than directly sending mail or using a franking machine. Research shows that in the UK, for a simple enclosed letter, posted 2nd class, the saving could be as much as much as 40% per letter.  

There are also reverse systems, where handwritten letters can be delivered as email. This mail scanning service, sometimes called letter email, is increasingly popular with businesses and individuals who wish to access their mail from another country. However, special care must be taken to inspect local laws and the service provider's scanning practices to ensure that they are not reading the mail or acting on behalf of the client from a legal standpoint.

See also

 E-COM
 .post
 Mail forwarding
 Email forwarding
 Online post office
 Personal letter
 Postal history
 Print-to-mail
 V-mail
 Webmail
 Fax

Notes

Email
Webmail
Letters (message)
Postal services
Communication